Buco-Zau is a town and municipality in Cabinda Province in Angola. The municipality covers 1,979 km2 and had a population of 32,792 at the 2014 Census; the latest official estimate (as at mid 2019) is 37,741.

References

Populated places in Cabinda Province
Municipalities of Angola